Jane Ellen Zuengler (born April 7, 1948) is an American academic who works in the field of linguistics.

Career
She is currently a professor in the English department at the University of Wisconsin–Madison.  Additionally, she is the executive editor of the academic journal Applied Linguistics. Zuengler has published widely in the field of linguistics. Her research centers on language acquisition, classroom discourse, and global English. Zuengler received her B.A. from the University of Wisconsin–Eau Claire and completed her M.A. at the  University of Wisconsin-Madison. She then received her M.Ed. and Ed.D. from Columbia University in New York.

References

1948 births
University of Wisconsin–Madison faculty
University of Wisconsin–Madison alumni
University of Wisconsin–Eau Claire alumni
Teachers College, Columbia University alumni
Living people
Linguists from the United States
Women linguists
Presidents of the American Association for Applied Linguistics